15th Street may refer to:

 15th Street (SEPTA station), an American rapid transit station in Philadelphia
 15th Street – Prospect Park (IND Culver Line), a local station on the IND Culver Line of the New York City Subway
 Fifteenth Street, a street in Fayetteville, Arkansas carrying the state highway designation Arkansas Highway 16

See also
Fifteenth Street Financial Historic District